is a railway station on the Chuo Main Line in Shiojiri, Nagano, Japan, operated by East Japan Railway Company (JR East).

Lines
Midoriko Station is served by the Chuo Main Line and is 218.2 kilometers from the terminus of the line at Tokyo Station.

Station layout
The station consists of two side platforms serving two tracks, located in a cutting below ground level.

Platforms

History

Surrounding area
 Shiojiri-shuku
 National Route 20
 National Route 153

See also
 List of railway stations in Japan

References

External links

 JR East station information 

Railway stations in Nagano Prefecture
Chūō Main Line
Stations of East Japan Railway Company
Railway stations in Japan opened in 1983